This page details the all-time statistics, records, and other achievements pertaining to the Philadelphia 76ers.

Individual awards

NBA MVP
Wilt Chamberlain – 1966–1968
Julius Erving – 1981
Moses Malone – 1983
Allen Iverson – 2001

NBA Finals MVP
Moses Malone – 1983

NBA Defensive Player of the Year
Dikembe Mutombo – 2001

NBA Rookie of the Year
Allen Iverson – 1997
Michael Carter-Williams – 2014
Ben Simmons – 2018

NBA Sixth Man of the Year
Bobby Jones – 1983
Aaron McKie – 2001

NBA Most Improved Player of the Year
Dana Barros – 1995

NBA Coach of the Year
Dolph Schayes – 1966
Larry Brown – 2001

NBA Sportsmanship Award
Eric Snow – 2000

J. Walter Kennedy Citizenship Award
Julius Erving – 1983
Dikembe Mutombo – 2001
Samuel Dalembert – 2010

NBA scoring champion
Wilt Chamberlain – 1965, 1966
Allen Iverson – 1999, 2001, 2002, 2005
Joel Embiid- 2022

NBA All-Star Game head coaches
Al Cervi – 1952, 1955
Alex Hannum – 1968
Gene Shue – 1977
Billy Cunningham – 1978, 1980, 1981, 1983
Larry Brown – 2000
Doc Rivers – 2021

All-NBA First Team
Dolph Schayes – 1952–1955, 1957, 1958
Wilt Chamberlain – 1966–1968
Billy Cunningham – 1969–1971
George McGinnis – 1976
Julius Erving – 1978, 1980–1983
Moses Malone – 1983, 1985
Charles Barkley – 1988–1991
Allen Iverson – 1999, 2001, 2005
 

All-NBA Second Team
Al Cervi – 1950
Dolph Schayes – 1950, 1951, 1956, 1959–1961
Paul Seymour – 1954, 1955
Larry Costello – 1961
Hal Greer – 1963–1969
Wilt Chamberlain – 1965
Billy Cunningham – 1972
George McGinnis – 1977
Julius Erving – 1977, 1984
Moses Malone – 1984
Charles Barkley – 1986, 1987, 1992
Allen Iverson – 2000, 2002, 2003
Dikembe Mutombo – 2001
Joel Embiid – 2018, 2019, 2021, 2022

All-NBA Third Team
Dikembe Mutombo – 2002
Allen Iverson – 2006
Ben Simmons – 2020

NBA All-Defensive First Team
Bobby Jones – 1979–1984
Caldwell Jones – 1981, 1982
Maurice Cheeks – 1983–1986
Moses Malone – 1983
Dikembe Mutombo – 2001
Robert Covington – 2018
Ben Simmons – 2020, 2021

NBA All-Defensive Second Team
Bobby Jones – 1985
Maurice Cheeks – 1987
Rick Mahorn – 1990
Theo Ratliff – 1999
Dikembe Mutombo – 2002
Eric Snow – 2003
Andre Iguodala – 2011
Joel Embiid – 2018, 2019, 2021
Matisse Thybulle – 2021, 2022

NBA All-Rookie First Team
Lucious Jackson – 1965
Billy Cunningham – 1966
Fred Boyd – 1973
Charles Barkley – 1985
Hersey Hawkins – 1989
Jerry Stackhouse – 1996
Allen Iverson – 1997
Andre Iguodala – 2005
Michael Carter-Williams – 2014
Nerlens Noel – 2015
Jahlil Okafor – 2016
Joel Embiid – 2017
Dario Šarić – 2017
Ben Simmons – 2018

NBA All-Rookie Second Team
Clarence Weatherspoon – 1993
Shawn Bradley – 1994
Sharone Wright – 1995
Tim Thomas – 1998
Thaddeus Young – 2008

Franchise leaders

Bold denotes still active with team.

Italic denotes still active but not with team.

Points scored (regular season) (as of three quarters of the 2022–23 season)

 1. Hal Greer (21,586)
 2. Allen Iverson (19,931)
 3. Dolph Schayes (18,438)
 4. Julius Erving (18,364)
 5. Charles Barkley (14,184)
 6. Billy Cunningham (13,626)
 7. Red Kerr (11,699)
 8. Joel Embiid (10,444)
 9. Maurice Cheeks (10,429)
 10. Andre Iguodala (9,422)
 11. Chet Walker (9,043)
 12. Larry Costello (7,957)
 13. Fred Carter (7,673)
 14. Hersey Hawkins (7,657)
 15. Wilt Chamberlain (7,651)
 16. Steve Mix (7,559)
 17. Moses Malone (7,511)
 18. Andrew Toney (7,458)
 19. Doug Collins (7,427)
 20. Thaddeus Young (7,078)
 21. Clarence Weatherspoon (6,867)
 22. Bobby Jones (6,585)
 23. Paul Seymour (5,760)
 24. Al Bianchi (5,550)
 25. Dave Gambee (5,454)
 26. Tobias Harris (5,334)
 27. Wali Jones (5,229)
 28. Lucious Jackson (5,170)
 29. Lou Williams (5,158)
 30. Ron Anderson (5,138)
 31. George McGinnis (5,046)
 32. Darryl Dawkins (5,009)
 33. Samuel Dalembert (4,710)
 34. Ben Simmons (4,382)
 35. Archie Clark (4,381)
 36. Eric Snow (4,375)
 37. Aaron McKie (4,143)
 38. Jrue Holiday (3,994)
 39. Willie Green (3,954)
 40. Derrick Coleman (3,943)
 41. Robert Covington (3,821)
 42. George King (3,609)
 43. Mike Gminski (3,585)
 44. Kyle Korver (3,527)
 45. Andre Miller (3,510)
 46. Caldwell Jones (3,466)
 47. Earl Lloyd (3,432)
 48. Jerry Stackhouse (3,416)
 49. Johnny Dawkins (3,343)
 50. Elton Brand (3,341)

Other Statistics (regular season) (as of the middle of the 2022–23 season)

Team awards and records
Awards
NBA champions
 3 – 1955, 1967, 1983

Eastern Conference champions
 9 – 1950, 1954, 1955, 1967, 1977, 1980, 1982, 1983, 2001

Atlantic Division champions
 6''' – 1977, 1978, 1983, 1990, 2001, 2021

Records

Individual game records

All-Star Game selections
The following Nationals and 76ers players were selected to the NBA All-Star Game.

 Dolph Schayes – 1951–1962
 Red Rocha – 1951, 1952
 Billy Gabor – 1953
 Paul Seymour – 1953, 1954, 1955
 Johnny Kerr – 1956, 1959, 1963
 Larry Costello – 1958–1962, 1965
 George Yardley – 1960
 Hal Greer – 1961–1970
 Lee Shaffer – 1963
 Chet Walker – 1964, 1966, 1967
 Lucious Jackson – 1965
 Wilt Chamberlain – 1966, 1967, 1968
 Billy Cunningham – 1969–1972
 John Block – 1973
 Steve Mix – 1975
 Doug Collins – 1976–1979
 George McGinnis – 1976, 1977
 Julius Erving – 1977–1987
 Bobby Jones – 1981, 1982
 Maurice Cheeks – 1983, 1986, 1987, 1988
 Moses Malone – 1983–1986
 Andrew Toney – 1983, 1984
 Charles Barkley – 1987–1992
 Dana Barros – 1995
 Allen Iverson – 2000–2006, 2010
 Theo Ratliff – 2001
 Dikembe Mutombo – 2002
 Andre Iguodala – 2012
 Jrue Holiday – 2013
 Joel Embiid – 2018–2022
 Ben Simmons – 2019, 2020, 2021

References

records
National Basketball Association accomplishments and records by team